Mizhi hulu is pork fat with a flour wrapping glazed in honey. It is a traditional dish of Beijing cuisine. The traditional culinary method of this dish begins with the preparation of the main ingredients by mixing the pork fat with flour and then rolling it into circular forms.

Flour is mixed with warm water to form spheres, which are then soaked in boiling water. After the flour sphere is taken out of boiling water, the process is repeated three times, and finally mixed with eggs to form a paste. The pork fat covered with flour is then cut into pieces and each piece is covered with the paste made of flour and egg, and deep fried.

Honey is stewed until its colour turns dark, then the fried pork fat spheres covered with paste are dipped into the honey, and the dish is served. Before serving, other ingredients such as sugar can be added.

Usually, for every three hundred grams of pork fat, two hundred grams of honey and two eggs are used. Due to its high sugar content and the usage of pork fat, the dish is currently rare because it is considered unhealthy.

References 

Beijing cuisine